The 2015–16 Pepperdine Waves women's basketball team will represent Pepperdine University in the 2015–16 college basketball season. The Waves, members of the West Coast Conference, were led by third year coach Ryan Weisenberg. The Waves play their home games at the Firestone Fieldhouse on the university campus in Malibu, California. They finished the season 7–24, 2–16 in WCC play to finish in ninth place. They lost in the first round of the WCC women's tournament to Loyola Marymount.

Roster

Schedule

|-
!colspan=9 style="background:#0021A5; color:#FF6200;"| Exhibition

|-
!colspan=9 style="background:#0021A5; color:#FF6200;"| Non-conference regular season

|-
!colspan=9 style="background:#0021A5; color:#FF6200;"| WCC regular season

|-
!colspan=9 style="background:#0021A5;"| WCC Women's Tournament

See also
 2015–16 Pepperdine Waves men's basketball team

References

Pepperdine
Pepperdine Waves women's basketball seasons
Pepperdine
Pepperdine